Veolia Water Central (formerly Three Valleys Water) was a privately owned company supplying water to Hertfordshire and parts of Surrey, North London and Bedfordshire, in England. It was owned by Veolia Environnement, a French company with international interests in the water, waste management, energy and transportation sectors.

Veolia Water Central was sold along with its sister companies Veolia Water Southeast and Veolia Water East to Morgan Stanley and M&G Investments in 2012. The three companies were merged to form Affinity Water on 1 October 2012.

History

The company was formed as Three Valleys Water in 1994 by the merger of the Colne Valley, Rickmansworth and Lee Valley Water companies. North Surrey Water joined the group in October 2000.

The company was renamed Veolia Water Central Limited in 2009. In 2012, following the sale of Veolia Water's UK water supply business, it was merged with Veolia Water Southeast and Veolia Water East to form Affinity Water on 1 October 2012.

Supply area
The area served lay to the north and west of London, including parts of Hertfordshire, Bedfordshire, Buckinghamshire, Essex, Middlesex and Surrey.

The company depended heavily upon the local chalk aquifer for its supplies. Eventually due to a combination of lower than average rainfall and growing demand, the aquifer became depleted. This affected the environment as some watercourses become seasonal and domestic users were subject to drought restrictions, for the first time for many years. This may have been a contributing factor in the outbreak of Cryptosporidium parvum in March 1997 when Three Valleys had to ask 300,000 consumers in Hertfordshire and thousands more in the London boroughs of Harrow and Brent to boil water. The health warning also caused the closure of schools in affected areas. The source was never isolated though several water supply boreholes in the Chalk aquifer between St Albans and Bushey contained the pathogen.

Hemel Hempstead lay within the company's area. After the major fire at the Hertfordshire Oil Storage Terminal at Buncefield, efforts were made to deal with contaminants to the local aquifer and bore holes.

References

External links
 Affinity Water, Our history
 Veolia Water website

Water Central
Former water companies of England
British companies established in 1994
Companies disestablished in 2012
1994 establishments in England
2012 disestablishments in England
Companies based in Welwyn Hatfield